The Rock Island Passenger Depot is an historic building located in Oskaloosa, Iowa, United States.  The Chicago, Rock Island & Pacific Railroad arrived in town in 1876, and they built a frame combination depot on the north side of the tracks.  This depot replaced the original one in 1888 on the south side of the tracks, and it served ten passenger trains a day.  A separate freight depot was built to the east.  President Theodore Roosevelt stopped here when he came to dedicate the new Y.M.C.A. in 1903.  The freight and passenger depots were combined into a single facility once again in 1930, utilizing the passenger depot.  The depot was officially abandoned in 1973.   It was listed on the National Register of Historic Places in 1989.  The building now houses a pub.

The depot is a single-story brick structure in the Stick-Eastlake style.  When used as a depot it had a men's waiting room on the west side and woman's room on the east.  The ticket agent and a lunch counter separated them.  There was also a room for baggage and restrooms facilities.  It is not known who designed the building.

References

Railway stations in the United States opened in 1888
Railway stations closed in 1973
Osk
Former railway stations in Iowa
Oskaloosa, Iowa
Stick-Eastlake architecture in Iowa
Transportation buildings and structures in Mahaska County, Iowa
National Register of Historic Places in Mahaska County, Iowa
Railway stations on the National Register of Historic Places in Iowa
1888 establishments in Iowa
1973 disestablishments in Iowa